Unthank may refer to:

Places

England
Unthank, Dalston, Cumbria
Unthank, Glassonby, Cumbria
Unthank, Skelton, Cumbria
Unthank, Derbyshire
Unthank, Harwood, County Durham
Unthank, Stanhope, County Durham
Newtown Unthank, Leicestershire
Unthank, Alnham, Northumberland
Unthank, Haltwhistle, Northumberland
location of Unthank Hall
Unthank, North Yorkshire, Yorkshire

Scotland
Unthank, Angus
Unthank, Dumfries and Galloway
Unthank, South Lanarkshire
Unthank, Moray

In fiction
a city in Alasdair Gray's book Lanark

People with the surname
 DeNorval Unthank (1899–1977), Oregon's 2nd African American doctor and civil rights pioneer
 DeNorval Unthank Jr. (1929–2000), son of DeNorval Unthank and architect
 Nellie Unthank (1846–1915), Mormon pioneer
 Valda Unthank (1909–1987), Australian cyclist
 Rachel and Becky Unthank, singers in the group The Unthanks (see below)

See also
Unthank End
The Unthanks, an English folk group from Northumberland
Intake (land), also known as unthank, a parcel of land
Unthanks Cave, a cave in Virginia